Madžarevo is a village in Croatia. It is connected by the D24 highway and R201 railway.

External links

Populated places in Varaždin County